The 1972 All-SEC football team consists of American football players selected to the All-Southeastern Conference (SEC) chosen by various selectors for the 1972 NCAA University Division football season. Alabama won the conference.

Offensive selections

Receivers 
 Wayne Wheeler, Alabama (AP-1, UPI)
 Gerald Keigley, LSU (AP-2, UPI)
 Bill Buckley, Miss. St. (AP-1)
 Walter Overton, Vanderbilt (AP-2)

Tight ends 

Butch Veazey, Ole Miss (AP-1, UPI)
Brad Boyd, LSU (AP-2)

Tackles 
 Mac Lorendo, Auburn (AP-1, UPI)
 Don Leathers, Ole Miss (AP-1)
 Buddy Brown, Alabama (UPI)
Paul Parker, Florida (AP-2)
 L. T. Southall, Vanderbilt (AP-2)

Guards 
 John Hannah, Alabama (AP-1, UPI)
Bill Emendorfer, Tennessee (AP-1, UPI)
Tyler Lafauci, LSU (AP-2)
Art Bressler, Ole Miss (AP-2)
Jay Casey, Auburn (AP-2)

Centers 
Jimmy Krapf, Alabama (AP-1, UPI)
 Chris Hammond, Georgia (AP-2)

Quarterbacks 

 Terry Davis, Alabama (AP-1, UPI)
Bert Jones, LSU (AP-2, UPI)

Running backs 
 Nat Moore, Florida (AP-1, UPI)
 Terry Hanley, Auburn (AP-1, UPI)
Haskel Stanback, Tennessee (AP-2)
Steve Bisceglia, Alabama (AP-2)

Defensive selections

Ends 

 Danny Sanspree, Auburn (AP-1, UPI)
 John Mitchell, Alabama (AP-1, UPI)
Ricky Browne, Florida (AP-2)
 John Croyle, Alabama (AP-2)

Tackles 
John Wood, LSU (AP-1, UPI)
John Wagster, Tennessee (AP-1)
Benny Sivley, Auburn (AP-2, UPI)
Skip Kubelius, Alabama (AP-2)

Linebackers 

 Jamie Rotella, Tennessee (AP-1, UPI)
Warren Capone, LSU (AP-1)
Fred Abbott, Florida (AP-1, UPI)
Chuck Strickland, Alabama (UPI)
Ken Bernich, Auburn (AP-2)
John D. Calhoun, Miss. St. (AP-2)
Art Reynolds, Tennessee (AP-2)

Backs 
Bobby McKinney, Alabama (AP-1, UPI)
Conrad Graham, Tennessee (AP-1, UPI)
Dave Beck, Auburn (AP-1, UPI)
Ken Stone, Vanderbilt (AP-1)
Frank Dowsing, Miss. St. (UPI)
Darryl Bishop, Kentucky (AP-2)
Jim Revels, Florida (AP-2)
Ken Phares, Miss. St. (AP-2)
Mike Williams, LSU (AP-2)

Special teams

Kicker 

 Ricky Townsend, Tennessee (AP-1)
Gardner Jett, Auburn(AP-2)

Punter 

Greg Gantt, Alabama (AP-1)
Rusty Jackson, LSU (AP-2)

Key
AP = Associated Press

UPI = United Press International

Bold = Consensus first-team selection by both AP and UPI

See also
1972 College Football All-America Team

References

All-SEC
All-SEC football teams